This is a list of currently or to be released Stargate literature.

Based on the movie

Based on the television series

Short fiction
The official Stargate Magazine, produced by Titan Publishing, began publishing short stories written by Fandemonium authors in their 8th issue. The stories alternate between both SG-1 and Atlantis. The magazine was available in the UK and internationally through Diamond Comic Distributors' Previews catalogue, and ended with issue #36.

References

External links
 Stargate Novels Official Homepage
 Gateworld Reviews of Books 

Literature
Lists of novels based on works